Ogre, in comics, may refer to:

 Marvel Comics characters:
 Ogre (Marvel Comics), a Marvel Comics character, first appearing in X-Men in 1967
 Fixer (Paul Norbert Ebersol), a Marvel character who disguised himself as Ogre to infiltrate the Thunderbolts
 Ogress (comics), a Marvel supervillain and enemy of the Hulk
 Ogre, a member of the Wicked Brigade
 DC Comics character and groups:
 Ogre (DC Comics), a DC Comics genetically-engineered character, first appearing in Batman in 1996
 O.G.R.E. (comics), acronym used by two fictional villain organizations in DC Comics' Aquaman
 Ogre (Rave Master), an antagonist in the Japanese manga/anime series
 OGRE, a comic book series from Source Point Press.

See also
 Ogre (disambiguation)

References